Verukal is a Malayalam semi-autobiographical novel written by Malayattoor Ramakrishnan in 1966. It is widely credited as one of his best works. It won the Kerala Sahitya Akademi Award in 1967.

Plot summary
Verukal tells the story of a family of Tamil speaking Iyers who settled in Kerala. Raghu is the protagonist of the story. The pivotal event on which the novel turns is the return of Raghu to his native village after a lapse of several years, to raise money to build a city mansion for himself by selling his ancestral home. He sets about this reluctantly, under pressure from his shrewish and domineering wife. In the village, as he meets his sisters and others among whom he grew up, a flood of memories overwhelms him, and he abruptly changes his mind about selling the property.

Main characters
 Raghu - the protagonist
 Ammulu - Raghu eldest sister
 Lakshmi - Raghu's sister
 Maniyan Athimbaar - Ammulu's husband
 Yajneswarayyar (Ammaanchi) - Lakshmi's husband
 Vishwanathan Iyer - Raghu's father
 Amma - Raghu's mother
 Aadi Narayana Swami (Patta) - Raghu's grandpa
 Ganapathi Patta - Raghu's great grandpa
 Geetha - Raghu's wife
 Ajayan - Raghu's son
 Suma -Raghu's daughter
 Saraswathy - Raghu's younger sister
 Bharathan - Saraswathy's husband
 Rajappan - Raghu's Roommate
 Raman Karthav - manakkale karyasthan
 Periyappa (appu) - Raghu's uncle

References

1966 novels
Malayalam novels
Indian autobiographical novels
Novels by Malayattoor Ramakrishnan
Novels set in Kerala
Kerala Sahitya Akademi Award-winning works
DC Books books
1966 Indian novels